{{Taxobox
| domain = Archaea
| regnum = Euryarchaeota
| phylum = Euryarchaeota
| classis = Halobacteria
| ordo = Halobacteriales
| familia = Halobacteriaceae Gibbons 1974
| subdivision_ranks = Genera
| subdivision =
Haladaptatus Savage et al. 2007 emend. Roh et al. 2010
Halalkalicoccus Xue et al. 2005
Halanaeroarchaeum
Halarchaeum Minegishi et al. 2010
Haloarchaeobius
Halobacterium Elazari-Volcani 1957 emend. Oren et al. 2009
Halocalculus
Halocatena
Halodesulfurarchaeum
Halomarina Inoue et al. 2011
Halomicrococcus
Halorubellus
Halorussus ♠ Cui et al. 2010
Halosiccatus
Halostella
Halovarius
Halovenus
Natribaculum
Natronoarchaeum Shimane et al. 2010
Natronomonas Kamekura et al. 1997 emend. Burns et al. 2010
Salarchaeum Shimane et al. 2011
Salinibaculum
Salinirubellus
Salinirubrumcand. Haloalcalophilium ♠ Lizama et al. 2000
}}

In taxonomy, the Halobacteriaceae are a family of the Halobacteriales in the domain Archaea. Halobacteriaceae represent a large part of halophilic Archaea, along with members in two other methanogenic families, Methanosarcinaceae and Methanocalculaceae. The family consists of many diverse genera that can survive extreme environmental niches. Most commonly, Halobacteriaceae are found in hypersaline lakes and can even tolerate sites polluted by heavy metals. They include neutrophiles, acidophiles (ex. Halarchaeum acidiphilum), alkaliphiles (ex. Natronobacterium''), and there have even been psychrotolerant species discovered (ex. Hrr. lacusprofundi). Some members have been known to live aerobically, as well as anaerobically, and they come in many different morphologies. These diverse morphologies include rods in genus Halobacterium, cocci in Halococcus, flattened discs or cups in Haloferax, and other shapes ranging from flattened triangles in Haloarcula to squares in Haloquadratum, and Natronorubrum. Most species of Halobacteriaceae are best known for their high salt tolerance and red-pink pigmented members (due to bacterioruberin carotenoids), but there are also non-pigmented species and those that require moderate salt conditions. Some species of Halobacteriaceae have been shown to exhibit phosphorus solubilizing activities that contribute to phosphorus cycling in hypersaline environments. Techniques such as 16S rRNA analysis and DNA-DNA hybridization have been major contributors to taxonomic classification in Halobacteriaceae, partly due to the difficulty in culturing halophilic Archaea.

Overview 
Halobacteriaceae are found in water saturated or nearly saturated with salt.  They are also called halophiles, though this name is also used for other organisms which live in somewhat less concentrated salt water.  They are common in most environments where large amounts of salt, moisture, and organic material are available.  Large blooms appear reddish, from the pigment bacteriorhodopsin.  This pigment is used to absorb light, which provides energy to create ATP.  Halobacteria also possess a second pigment, halorhodopsin, which pumps in chloride ions in response to photons, creating a voltage gradient and assisting in the production of energy from light.  The process is unrelated to other forms of photosynthesis involving electron transport and halobacteria are incapable of fixing carbon from carbon dioxide.

Halobacteria can exist in salty environments because although they are aerobes, they have a separate and different way of creating energy through use of light energy.  Parts of the membranes of halobacteria are purplish in color and contain retinal pigment.  This allows them to create a proton gradient across the membrane of the cell which can be used to create ATP for their own use.

They have certain adaptations to live within their salty environments. For example, their cellular machinery is adapted to high salt concentrations by having charged amino acids on their surfaces, allowing the cell to keep its water molecules around these components. The osmotic pressure and these amino acids help to control the amount of salt within the cell. However, because of these adaptations, if the cell is placed in a wet, less salty environment, it is likely to immediately burst from the osmotic pressure.

Phylogeny
The currently accepted taxonomy is based on the List of Prokaryotic names with Standing in Nomenclature (LPSN) and National Center for Biotechnology Information (NCBI)
and the phylogeny is based on 16S rRNA-based LTP release 106 by 'The All-Species Living Tree' Project.

Notes:
♠ Strains found at the National Center for Biotechnology Information (NCBI) but not listed in the List of Prokaryotic names with Standing in Nomenclature (LPSN)
♣ International Journal of Systematic Bacteriology or International Journal of Systematic and Evolutionary Microbiology (IJSB/IJSEM) published species that are in press.

References

Further reading

Scientific journals

Scientific books

Scientific databases

External links 

 Correct names of taxa within the family Halobacteriaceae

Archaea taxonomic families
Euryarchaeota